M Dot Mobile or simply known as M.Mobile is an R&D and mobile communication design company based in Malaysia. M.Mobile is Malaysia's first cell phone manufacturer and is also the world's first Muslim-owned mobile phone R&D and marketing company, in a partnership between Malaysia and China. This company is currently in operation under its parent company, Kosmo Technology Industrial Berhad. Kosmo announced the acquisition of a 30% stake in Malaysia's first and only full-fledged mobile phone company, M.Mobile in February 2006.

MMobile's Mobile Phones

M10Hajj
M10
MB110
MB210
MB210i
MB310
MS310
MB320
MB330
MB360
MB370
MB380
MS310

References

Kosmo Technology Industrial Berhad Homepage

2005 establishments in Malaysia
Mobile phone manufacturers
Privately held companies of Malaysia
Companies based in Kuala Lumpur
Malaysian companies established in 2005
Malaysian brands
Manufacturing companies established in 2005